The Monumento ecuestre a Bartolomé Mitre located on Plaza Mitre, a landmark in the Recoleta neighbourhood of Buenos Aires, Argentina, and was raised in honor of Bartolomé Mitre (1821-1906).

History 
It is a work by Italian sculptors David Calandra and Eduardo Rubino in 1927.

The Mitre bronze figure stands on a polished red granite base surrounded by allegories of Carrara marble. The monument was inaugurated on July 8, 1927, with a speech by the Minister of War, General Agustín P. Justo.

Location 
Located on the Plaza Mitre, between the British Embassy and Biblioteca Nacional. Across the Del Libertador avenue, opposite to the Memorial, is located the Plaza Ruben Dario, and the Museo Nacional de Bellas Artes.

Gallery

References 

Monuments and memorials in Buenos Aires
1927 sculptures
Outdoor sculptures in Argentina
Tourist attractions in Buenos Aires